Suillus weaverae (sometimes incorrectly referred to as Suillus granulatus in North America) is a bolete mushroom in the genus Suillus found in the United States and Canada. Previously thought to only exist in small numbers in Minnesota, Suillus weaverae has been rediscovered as a species wherever Suillus granulatus has been described in the Eastern United States.

References

External links

weaverae
Fungi of North America
Taxa named by Alexander H. Smith